Lê Văn Tân (born Jonathan Quartey; on 30 July 1984) is a Vietnamese – Ghanaian football striker.

In February 2018, he moved to India and signed with Gokulam Kerala.

References

External links

1984 births
Living people
Association football forwards
Ghanaian emigrants to Vietnam
Ghanaian footballers
Vietnamese footballers
Ghana international footballers
Expatriate footballers in Vietnam
Liberty Professionals F.C. players
Thanh Hóa FC players
Saigon FC players
Footballers from Accra